m-Phenylenediamine, also called 1,3-diaminobenzene, is an organic compound with the formula C6H4(NH2)2. It is an isomer of o-phenylenediamine and p-phenylenediamine. This aromatic diamine is a colourless solid that appears as needles, but turns red or purple on exposure to air due to formation of oxidation products. Samples often come as colourless flakes and may darken in storage.

Production
m-Phenylenediamine is produced by hydrogenation of 1,3-dinitrobenzene. The dinitrobenzene is prepared by dinitration of benzene.

Applications
m-Phenylenediamine is used in the preparation of various polymers including aramid fibers, epoxy resins, wire enamel coatings and polyurea elastomers. Other uses for m-phenylenediamine include as an accelerator for adhesive resins, and as a component of dyes for leather and textiles. Basic Brown 1 (Bismarck Brown), Basic Orange 2, Direct Black 38, and Developed Black BH. In hair-dying, m-phenylenediamine is a "coupling agent", used to produce blue colors.

References

Diamines
Anilines